Jeffery Daniel Molkentin (born January 15, 1967 in Milwaukee, Wisconsin) is an American molecular biologist. He is the director of Molecular Cardiovascular Biology for Cincinnati Children's hospital where he is also co-director of their Heart Institute. Molkentin holds a professorship at the University of Cincinnati's Department of Pediatrics.

Biography 
Molkentin was born and raised in Milwaukee, Wisconsin., where he attended Marquette University, receiving a B.S. in biology in 1989. He began studies to be a medical doctor at the University of Wisconsin, but switched to a research program, and received his PhD in physiology from the Medical College of Wisconsin in 1994.

Molkentin's work focuses on heart disease and muscular dystrophy, though he is involved in other types of research entailing calcium handling, ER stress signaling, cardiac hypertrophic signaling pathways, and COVID-19 disease mechanisms. One of Molkentin's most notable research achievements was his contribution to stem cell therapy in the heart and his disproving prior research about the topic.

Molkentin is among the most highly cited researchers in the world, with his publications being cited over 50,000 times in literature. His work has been published in several prestigious research journals, including "Nature", "PNAS", and "Circulation Research".

Molkentin has been a full investigator for the Howard Hughes Medical Institute (HHMI) from 2008-2021.

Awards and honors 
1998 Pew Scholar in the Biomedical Sciences
2012 AHA Basic Science Research Prize
2015 Lucian Award
2019 AHA Merit Award Winner

Selected publications 

 MCUb induction protects the heart from postischemic remodeling. Huo, J; Lu, S; Kwong, JQ; Bround, MJ; Grimes, KM; Sargent, MA; Brown, ME; Davis, ME; Bers, DM; Molkentin, JD. Circulation Research. 2020; 127:379-390.
 An acute immune response underlies the benefit of cardiac stem cell therapy. Vagnozzi, RJ; Maillet, M; Sargent, MA; Khalil, H; Johansen, AK Z; Schwanekamp, JA; York, AJ; Huang, V; Nahrendorf, M; Sadayappan, S; et al. Nature. 2020; 577:405-409.
 Disruption of valosin-containing protein activity causes cardiomyopathy and reveals pleiotropic functions in cardiac homeostasis. Brody, MJ; Vanhoutte, D; Bakshi, CV; Liu, R; Correll, RN; Sargent, MA; Molkentin, JD. The Journal of biological chemistry. 2019; 294:8918-8929.
 ERK1/2 signaling induces skeletal muscle slow fiber-type switching and reduces muscular dystrophy disease severity. Boyer, JG; Prasad, V; Song, T; Lee, D; Fu, X; Grimes, KM; Sargent, MA; Sadayappan, S; Molkentin, JD. JCI insight. 2019; 5.

References 

1967 births
University of Cincinnati people
Molecular biologists
Marquette University alumni
Living people